Events from the year 1379 in Ireland.

Incumbent
Lord: Richard II

Events
 John Colton, Deans of St. Patrick's Cathedral, Dublin was appointed Lord Chancellor of Ireland

Births

Deaths

References

 
1370s in Ireland
Ireland
Years of the 14th century in Ireland